Granderson is a surname. Notable people with the surname include:

 Carl Granderson (born 1996), American football player
 Curtis Granderson, Major League Baseball player
 Lily Ann Granderson, 19th century teacher
 LZ Granderson, American sportswriter
 Rufus Granderson, American football player